Maitane Etxeberria Martínez (born 15 January 1997) is a Spanish female handballer for Super Amara Bera Bera and the Spanish national team.

Achievements   
División de Honor:
Winner: 2014, 2015, 2016, 2018
Silver Medalist: 2017

Copa de la Reina:
Winner: 2014, 2016
Finalist: 2015, 2017

Supercopa de España:
Winner: 2014, 2015, 2016, 2017

Individual awards  
 All-Star Right Wing of the EHF Junior European Championship: 2015

References

External links

Living people
1997 births
Spanish female handball players
People from Errenteria
Sportspeople from Gipuzkoa
Competitors at the 2018 Mediterranean Games
Mediterranean Games gold medalists for Spain
Mediterranean Games medalists in handball
Handball players from the Basque Country (autonomous community)
21st-century Spanish women